State Trunk Highway 178 (often called Highway 178, STH-178 or WIS 178) is a  state highway in Chippewa County, Wisconsin, United States, that runs north–south roughly along the Chippewa River from Chippewa Falls to Cornell.

Route description
From Lake Hallie to Cornell, WIS 178 entirely follows the west bank of the river.

WIS 178 begins at a WIS 29/WIS 29 Bus. at a diamond interchange. It begins as a four-lane divided roadway. It then curves north in the shape of a hook. It then meanders northward. After intersecting CTH-S at the city limit, WIS 178 downgrades into a two-lane undivided roadway. It still continues to meander northward. Eventually, WIS 178 ends at WIS 64 in Cornell.

History
Before the creation of WIS 178, CTH-I used to follow most of present-day WIS 178. In 1947, WIS 178 was formed. WIS 178 previously began in Chippewa Falls at WIS 124. In 2006 it was rerouted east of the city along Seymour Cray Sr. Boulevard to WIS 29.

Major intersections

See also

References

External links

178
Transportation in Chippewa County, Wisconsin